Harry Loves Lisa is an American reality television series on TV Land starring married couple Harry Hamlin and Lisa Rinna. The series follows the couple and their two preteen daughters as they live a hectic Hollywood lifestyle.

The series premiered on TV Land on October 6, 2010, at 10pm and ran for six episodes. At the time of its airing, the premiere was the highest rated TVLand reality premiere since 2007. The series was produced by Good Clean Fun.

References

External links 

2010 American television series debuts
2010 American television series endings
2010s American reality television series
English-language television shows
TV Land original programming
Television series by Good Clean Fun (production company)